Đại Việt (literally Great Việt), often known as Annam (Chữ Hán: 安南), was a monarchy in eastern Mainland Southeast Asia from the 10th century AD to the early 19th century, centered around the region of present-day Hanoi, Northern Vietnam. Its early name, Đại Cồ Việt, was established in 968 by Vietnamese ruler Đinh Bộ Lĩnh after he ended the Anarchy of the 12 Warlords, until the beginning of the reign of Lý Thánh Tông (r. 1054–1072), the third emperor of the Lý dynasty. Đại Việt lasted until the reign of Gia Long (r. 1802–1820), the first emperor of the Nguyễn dynasty, when the name was changed to Việt Nam.

Đại Việt's history is divided into the rule of eight dynasties: Đinh (968–980), Early Lê (980–1009), Lý (1009–1226), Trần (1226–1400), Hồ (1400–1407), and Later Lê (1428–1789); the Mạc dynasty (1527–1677); and the brief Tây Sơn dynasty (1778–1802). It was briefly interrupted by the Hồ dynasty (1400–1407), who changed the country's name briefly to Đại Ngu, and the Fourth Era of Northern Domination (1407–1427) when the region was administered as Jiaozhi by the Ming dynasty. Đại Việt's history can also be divided into two periods: unified empire, which lasted from 960s to 1533, and fragmented from 1533 to 1802, when there were more than one dynasty and noble clans simultaneously ruling from their own domains. From the 13th to 18th century, Đại Việt's borders expanded to encompass territory that resemble modern-day Vietnam, which lies along the South China Sea from the Gulf of Tonkin to the Gulf of Thailand.

Early Đại Việt emerged in the 960s as a hereditary monarchy with Mahayana Buddhism as state religion, and lasted for 6 centuries. From the 16th century, Đại Việt gradually weakened and decentralized into multiple sub-kingdoms and domains, ruled by either the Lê, Mạc, Trịnh, Nguyễn families simultaneously. It was briefly unified by the Tây Sơn brothers in 1786, who divided among themselves in 1787. After the Trịnh-Nguyễn War which ended in Nguyễn victory and destruction of the Tây Sơn, Đại Việt was reunified, ending 300 years of fragmentation. From 968 to 1804, Đại Việt flourished and acquired significant power in the region. The state slowly annexed Champa and Cambodia's territories, expanding Vietnamese territories to the south and west. The Empire of Đại Việt is the primary precursor to the country of Vietnam and the basis for its national historic and cultural identity.

Etymology

The term "" (Yue) in Early Middle Chinese was first written using the logograph "戉" for an axe (a homophone), in oracle bone and bronze inscriptions of the late Shang dynasty ( BC), and later as "越". At the time it referred to a people or chieftain to the northwest of the Shang. In the early 8th century BC, a tribe on the middle Yangtze was called the Yangyue, a term later used for peoples further south. Between the 7th and 4th centuries BC Yue/Việt referred to the state of Yue in the lower Yangtze basin and its people.

From the 3rd century BC the term was used for the non-Han Chinese populations of south and southwest China and northern Vietnam, with particular ethnic groups called Minyue, Ouyue, Luoyue (Vietnamese: Lạc Việt), etc., collectively called the Baiyue (Bách Việt,). The term Baiyue/Bách Việt first appeared in the book Lüshi Chunqiu compiled around 239 BC. According to Ye Wenxian (1990), apud Wan (2013), the ethnonym of the Yuefang in northwestern China is not associated with that of the Baiyue in southeastern China.

At first, Yue referred to all peoples of the south that practiced un-Chinese slash-and-burn cultivation and lived in stilt houses, but this definition does not suggest that all Yue were the same and spoke the same language. They were loosely-connected or independent tribal societies belonging to a diverse ethnolinguistic complex. As Chinese imperial power expanded toward the south, Chinese sources generalized the tribes of Northern Vietnam at the time as Yue, or the Luoyue and the Ouyue (Lạc Việt and Au Viet in Vietnamese). Over time, the term Yue morphed and became a geopolitical designation rather than a term for a group of people, and became more of a historical and political term rather than tied to connotations of barbarism. During the period of Chinese rule, many states and rebellions in the former region of Yue (Southern China and Northern Vietnam) used the name Yue as an old geopolitical name rather than as an ethnonym.

When the word Yue (Middle Chinese: ɦʉɐt̚) was borrowed into Vietnamese language during the late Tang dynasty (618–907) by the Austroasiatic Viet-Muong speaking peoples who were the ancestors of modern-day Vietnamese Kinh, the exonym was gradually localized to become an endonym of the Vietnamese. That endonym might have been manifested in different forms depending on how neighboring peoples who interact with, referred to the Vietnamese back then, and until modern-day, for instance, the Cham have been calling the Vietnamese as Yuen (yvan) from the reign of Harivarman IV (1074–1080) to present unchanged. It is evident that Vietnamese elites tried to tie their ethnic identity to the ancient Yue through constructed traditions during the late medieval period. However, all endonyms and exonyms referring to the Vietnamese such as Viet, Kinh, or Kra–Dai Keeu, are related to political structures or have common origins in ancient Chinese geographical imagination. Most of the time, the Austroasiatic-speaking ancestors of the modern Kinh under one single ruler might have assumed for themselves a similar or identical self-designation inherent in the modern Vietnamese first-person pronoun ta (us, we, I) to differentiate themselves from other groups. In the older colloquial usage, ta corresponded to "ours" as opposed to "theirs", and during colonial times they were "nước ta" (our country) and "tiếng ta" (our language) in contrast to "nước tây" (western countries) and "tiếng tây" (western languages).

Historically Đại Việt, (Đại) Cồ Việt, or Cự Việt was the polity's official name and not a dynastic name. "Đại Việt Quốc" (the Great Viet state) was first mentioned in several brick inscriptions from Hoa Lu, the first capital of the polity, from the 10th century AD. According to Momoki (2014), the name (Đại) Cồ Việt is from the 15th-century chronicle Đại Việt sử ký toàn thư and likely originated from Cự Việt in 12th-century Ly dynasty inscriptions, rather than being the name for the kingdom during the late 10th century.

History

Origins

For a thousand years, the area of what is now Northern Vietnam was ruled by a succession of Chinese dynasties as Nanyue, Giao Chỉ (Jiaozhi), Giao Châu (Jiaozhou), Annan, and Jinghai Circuit.

Ancient Northern Vietnam and particularly the Red River Delta were inhabited by various different ethnolinguistic groups that constituted modern-day Hmong–Mien, Tibeto–Burman, Kra–Dai, Austroasiatic speaking peoples. Early societies had emerged and existed there for a while before the Han conquest in 111 BC, such as the Phùng Nguyên and Dong Son cultures. Both practiced metallurgy and sophisticated bronze-casting techniques. They were together called the Yue and barbarians by the Chinese and collectively understood as non-Chinese. Ancient Chinese texts do not give any distinction for each tribe, and not precisely indicate which languages of tribes that they interacted with in Northern Vietnam. All peoples living under the administration of the Empire were usually referred to as either “people” (ren 人) or “subjects” (min 民). There was absolutely no classification or distinction for "Vietnamese" and it is implausible to identify people accurate as such or implying modern ethnicity to the ancient. It is highly likely that these intermingled multilinguistic communities might have evolved into the present-day without modern ethnic consciousness until ethnic classification efforts carried out by the colonial government and successive governments of the Republic of Vietnam, Democratic Republic of Vietnam, and Socialist Republic of Vietnam, while retaining their intangible ethnic identity such as culture. There was no persisting "ethnic Vietnamese" identity during this period.

Official Vietnamese history textbooks usually assume that the people of Northern Vietnam during Chinese rules were Việt/Yue. The Yue were broad groups of non-Chinese peoples of the south which included many different ethnolinguistic groups who shared some certain customs. After the disappearance of the Baiyue and the Lac Viet from Chinese records around the first century AD, new indigenous tribal groups might have emerged in the region under the name of Li-Lao. The Li-Lao people were also known for their great drum casting tradition. However, the culture produced Heger Type II drums, while the previous Dong Son culture of the Lac Viet produced Heger Type I drums.

The Li Lao culture flourished from approximately 200 to 750 AD in present-day Southern China and Northern Vietnam. These Li tribes were recorded in Chinese sources as Lǐ (俚) "bandits" inhabiting the coastal areas between the Pearl River and Red River. Li political structures were distributed in numerous autonomous settlements/chiefdoms (dong 洞) located in riverine valleys. The Book of Sui notes that Li noblemen who possess bronze drum in each dong were called dulao (都老), which Churchman argues bears some resemblance and cultural connection to the previous local ruling class of the Red River Delta. The Li tribes were described as ferocious raiding bandits who refused to accept imperial authority, leading to Jiaozhou, the heartland of the Red River Delta, whence the Chinese deemed a lone, isolated borderlands with difficult, limited administration. Because the Li-Lao people managed to keep themselves away from Chinese sphere of cultural influence, the landscape of Northern Vietnam during Han-Tang period experienced a perfect equilibrium between Sinification and localization. From the sixth to the seventh century, Chinese dynasties attempted to militarily subdue the Li dong, gradually causing the Li Lao culture to decline.

The important effects of ten centuries of Chinese rules over Northern Vietnam arguably in terms of complex cultural and linguistics are still clear observable. Some native languages of the regions for a long time had employed Sinitic script and Sinitic-derived writing systems to represent their languages, such as Vietnamese, Tày, and Nùng.

James Chamberlain believes that the traditional Vietic realm was north central Vietnam/northern Laos and not the Red River Delta. Based on his interpretation of Keith Weller Taylor's examination of Chinese texts (Jiu Tangshu, Xin Tangshu, Suishu, Taiping Huanyu Ji, Tongdian), Chamberlain suggests that Việt-Mường peoples began emigrating from Central Vietnam (Jiuzhen, Rinan) to the Red River Delta in the seventh century, during the Tang dynasty, possibly due to pressure from the Khmers in the south or the Chinese in the north. Chamberlain speculates that during the rebellion led by Mai Thúc Loan, the son of a salt-producing family in Hoan province (today Hà Tĩnh Province, North-Central Vietnam), which lasted from 722 to 723, a large number of Sinicized lowland Vietic people or the Kinh moved north. The Jiu Tangshu records that Mai Thúc Loan, also known as Mai Huyền Thành, styled himself as the Black Emperor (possibly after his swarthy complexion), and that he had 400,000 followers from 23 provinces across Annam and other kingdoms, including Champa and Chenla.

However, archaeogenetics demonstrate that before the Đông Sơn period, the Red River Delta's inhabitants were predominantly Austroasiatic: genetic data from Phùng Nguyên culture's Mán Bạc burial site (dated 1,800 BC) have close proximity to modern Austroasiatic speakers; meanwhile, "mixed genetics" from Đông Sơn culture's Núi Nấp site showed affinity to "Dai from China, Tai-Kadai speakers from Thailand, and Austroasiatic speakers from Vietnam, including the Kinh"; therefore, "[t]he likely spread of Vietic was southward from the RRD, not northward. Accounting for southern diversity will require alternative explanations." Michael Churchman states that "the absence of records of large-scale population shifts indicates that there was a fairly stable group of people in Jiaozhi throughout the Han–Tang period who spoke Austroasiatic languages ancestral to modern Vietnamese". On a Buddhist inscription dated to the 8th century from Thanh Mai village, Hà Nội, 100 out of 136 women mentioned in the epigraphy could be identified as ethnic Vietnamese females. Linguist John Phan proposes that a local dialect of Middle Chinese called Annamese Middle Chinese developed and was spoken in the Red River Delta by descendants of Chinese immigrants, and later was absorbed into the co-existing Việt-Mường languages by the ninth century. Phan identifies three layers of Chinese loanwords into Vietnamese: the earliest layer of borrowing dates to the Han dynasty (ca. 1st century CE) and Jin dynasty (ca. 4th century CE); the late layer of borrowing dates to the post-Tang period, and the recent layer of borrowing dates to the Ming & Qing dynasties.

National historiography
Study of Northern Vietnam and the Red River Delta during the first millennium AD is highly problematic. This region is widely associated with the foundation of the modern country and nation-state of Vietnam. It has been given exceptional treatment and academic scrutiny compared to other regions. This unique academic focus has resulted in critical misinterpretations. Some notable academic works have echoed the established frameworks of colonial and postcolonial Vietnamese nationalist historiography in order to associate the entire history of the early Red River Delta with the Vietnamese, i.e. the Kinh, and the modern country of Vietnam. The rewriting of Vietnamese history in the 20th century considered pushing several nationalistic themed theories. On notable theory, the Continuity, is defined as a belief that the peoples of Red River Delta during Han-Tang period had always retained their unique "Vietnamese identity" and "Vietnamese spirit", which was arguably rooted in the highly sophisticated Van Lang kingdoms under the Hung kings, which were largely legends transformed into "historical facts" under the scholarship of the Democratic Republic of Vietnam. This was despite relentless Chinese acculturation, making them "different" from other groups in Southern China who "eventually lost their separate identities through assimilation to Chinese culture." The Continuity theory reconstructs the emergence of the Đại Việt kingdom in the 10th century as the awakening and resurrection of "Vietnamese sovereignty," and these traditions of Vietnamese exceptionalism continued into modern Vietnam. For example, Keith Taylor took up some aspects of Vietnamese nationalist historiography in his 1983 monograph, The Birth of Vietnam, and falsely asserted that "Vietnam's independence resulted from a thousand-year struggle to throw off Chinese rule by a group of people who held a conviction 'that they were not and did not want to become Chinese.'" Later, Taylor retreated from Vietnamese nationalist historiography.

No evidence of "ethnic Vietnamese" resembling what would be considered the modern Vietnamese exists during the Han-Tang period. Instead, ancient Northern Vietnam as well as today was very diverse and complex in terms of ethnolinguistic and cultural origins. The Continuity theory can be easily discredited by linguistic examinations. By the 9th-11th centuries, the northern portion of the Viet-Muong portion of Vietic speakers had just supposedly diverged, and one dialect cluster thereby evolved into Vietnamese. Other theories advocated by John Phan presents evidence of Vietnamese being developed from a creolized language which resulted from a local linguistic shift from Middle Chinese to proto-Vietnamese after Sinitic rule.

Beside anachronisms, Vietnamese nationalist scholarship also inserted a Vietnamese resistance myth into history by labeling any rebellious local group in Northern Vietnam during the Han-Tang period as collectively "Vietnamese" who 'were in constant struggles against the Chinese yokes,' in contrast to "corrupt invading Chinese colonizers", generic modern nationalities and ethnicities. The context was heavily entangled with modern perceptions about Vietnam during decolonization and the Cold War. Historians such as Catherine Churchman have criticized attempts of characterizing the past through the lens of modern national boundaries and projecting a "wish for the restoration of long-lost national independence" onto localized dynasties.

Founding

Prior to independence in the late 9th century, the area that became Đại Việt in northern Vietnam was ruled by the Tang dynasty as Annan. The hill dwellers on the western frontier of Annan and powerful chieftains such as Lý Do Độc allied with the state of Nanzhao in Yunnan and rebelled against the Tang dynasty in the 860s. They captured Annan in three years, forcing the lowlanders to scatter to asylums around the delta. The Tang dynasty turned back and defeated the Nanzhao-indigenous alliance in 866 and renamed the area Jinghai Circuit. A military mutiny forced Tang authorities to withdraw in 880 while loyalist troops left for home on their own initiative.

A regional regime led by the Khuc family formed on the Red River Delta in the early 10th century. From 907 to 917, Khúc Hạo and then Khúc Thừa Mỹ was appointed by Chinese dynasties as jiedushi, tributary governors. The Khúc did not try to create any kind of a de jure independent polity. In 930, the neighboring Southern Han state invaded Annam and removed the Khúc from power. In 931, Dương Đình Nghệ, a local chief from Aizhou, revolted and quickly ousted the Southern Han. In 937 he was assassinated by Kiều Công Tiễn, leader of the revanchist faction allied with the Southern Han. In 938, emperor Liu Gong of Southern Han led an invasion fleet to Annam to assist Kiều Công Tiễn. Dương Đình Nghệ's son-in-law Ngô Quyền, also was from the south, marched north and killed Kiều Công Tiễn. He then led the people to fight and destroyed the Southern Han fleet on the Bạch Đằng River.

After defeating the Southern Han invasion, Ngô Quyền proclaimed himself king and established a new dynasty in Cổ Loa citadel over the Principality. Cổ Loa's sphere of influence probably did not reach the other local nobility. In 944, after his death, Ngô Quyền's brother-in-law Dương Tam Kha (son of Dương Đình Nghệ) took power. The Dương clan increased factional segregation by bringing more southern men into the court. As a result, the principality broke apart during the reign of Tam Kha. Ngô Quyền's sons Ngô Xương Văn and Ngô Xương Ngập deposed their maternal uncle and became dual kings in 950. In 954, Ngô Xương Ngập died. The younger Ngô Xương Văn ruled as the sole king, and nine years later he was killed by warlords. Chaos unleashed across the Red River Delta.

Early Đại Việt

A new leader of prowess named Đinh Bộ Lĩnh emerged. From Hoa Lư, he and his son Đinh Liễn spent two years in political and military struggle and managed to subdue all warlords and oppositions. Around 967 or 968, Đinh Bộ Lĩnh established the kingdom of Đại Cồ Việt (大瞿越) (meaning "The Great Gau(tama)'s Việt"), and moved the court to Hoa Lư. He (r. 968–979) became king of Đại Cồ Việt and titled himself emperor, while Prince Đinh Liễn became the great prince. In 973 and 975, Đinh Bộ Lĩnh sent two embassies to the Song dynasty and established relationships. Buddhist clergy were put in charge of important positions. Coins were minted. The territories of the early Việt state comprised the lowland Red River Basin to the Nghệ An region. According to a Hoa Lư inscription (c. 979), in that year Đinh Liễn murdered his brother Đinh Hạng Lang who had been promoted to crown prince by his father. In late 979, both Đinh Bộ Lĩnh and Đinh Liễn were assassinated. Hearing the news, Ngô Nhật Khánh, a prince of the old royal family in exile-and king Paramesvaravarman I of Champa launched a naval attack on Hoa Lư, but much of the fleet was capsized by a late-season typhoon.

Queen Dương Vân Nga placed her partner, general Lê Hoàn, as chief of the state. Lê Hoàn's rivals then attacked him but were defeated. The queen of the Dương family decided to replace the Đinh family with the Lê family of Lê Hoàn, and brought the crown from her six-year-old son Đinh Toàn (r. 979–980) to her mate Lê Hoàn (r. 980–1005) in 980. Disturbances in Đại Cồ Việt attracted attention from the Song dynasty. In 981, the Song Emperor launched an invasion of Đại Cồ Việt, but was repulsed by Lê Hoàn. In 982 he attacked Champa, killed the Cham king Paramesvaravarman I, and destroyed a Cham city. A Khmer inscription (c. 987) mentioned that in that year, some Vietnamese merchants or envoys arrived in Cambodia through the Mekong.

After Lê Hoàn died in 1005, civil war broke out between crown princes Lê Long Việt, Lê Long Đĩnh, Lê Long Tích, and Lê Long Kính. Long Việt (r. 1005) was murdered by Long Đĩnh while after ruling for three days. As the Lê brothers fought each other, the Lý family-a member of the court's cadet, led by Lý Công Uẩn, quickly rose to power. Long Đĩnh (r. 1005–1009) ruled as a tyrant king and developed hemorrhoids. He died in November 1009. Lý Công Uẩn ascended the throne two days later, with support from the monks, as Lý Thái Tổ.

Flourishing period

Emperor Lý Thái Tổ (r. 1009–1028) moved the court to the abandoned city of Đại La, which had previously been a seat of power under the Tang dynasty, and renamed it to Thăng Long in 1010. The city became what is now present-day Hà Nội. To control and maintain the nation's wealth, in 1013 he created a taxation system per product. His reign was relatively peaceful, though he campaigned against the Han communities in Hà Giang massif and subdued them in 1014. He furthermore laid the basis of the stability Vietnamese state and his dynasty would rule the kingdom for the next 200 years.

Lý Thái Tổ's son and grandson Lý Thái Tông (r. 1028–1053) and Lý Thánh Tông (r. 1054–1071) continued to strengthen the Viet state. Starting during the reign of Lê Hoàn, the Việt expansion extended Việt territories from the Red River Delta in all directions. The Vietnamese destroyed the Cham northern capital Inprapura in 982, raided and plundered Southern Chinese port cities in 995, 1028, 1036, 1059, and 1060; subdued the Nùng people in 1039; raided Laos in 1045; invaded Champa and pillaged Cham cities in 1044 and 1069, and subjugated three northern Cham provinces of Địa Lý, Ma Linh, and Bố Chính. Contact between the Song dynasty of China and the Việt state increased through raids and tributary mission, which resulted in Chinese cultural influences on Vietnamese culture, the first civil examination based on the Chinese model was staged in 1075, Chinese script was declared the official script of the court in 1174, and the emergence of Vietnamese demotic script (Chữ Nôm) occurred in the 12th century.

In 1054 Lý Thánh Tông changed his kingdom's name to Đại Việt and declared himself an emperor. He married an ordinary girl named Lady Ỷ Lan and she gave birth to the crown prince Lý Càn Đức. In 1072 the infant Lý Càn Đức became Emperor Lý Nhân Tông (r. 1072–1127), the longest-ruling monarch in Vietnamese history. During the early years of Lý Nhân Tông, his father's military leader Lý Thường Kiệt, uncle Lý Đạo Thành, and Queen Ỷ Lan became court regents. From the 1070s, border tensions between the Song Empire, local Tai principalities, and the Việt kingdom arose into open violence. In winter 1075, Lý Thường Kiệt led a naval invasion of southern China. Việt troops wreaked havoc on Chinese border towns, then laid siege to Nanning and captured it one month later. The Song emperor sent a large counter-invasion of Đại Việt in late 1076, but Lý Thường Kiệt was able to fend off and defeat the Song advance at the Battle of the Cầu River, where half of Song forces perished in combats and diseases. Lý Nhân Tông then offered peace with the Song, and later all hostilities were ended in 1084; the Song recognized the Việt polity as a sovereign kingdom. According to a fourteenth-century chronicle, the Đại Việt sử lược, the Khmer Empire sent three embassies to Đại Việt in 1086, 1088 and 1095. The matured Lý Nhân Tông came to rule in 1085. He defeated the Cham ruler Jaya Indravarman II in 1103, built the Dạm pagoda in Bắc Ninh in 1086, and constructed a Buddhist temple for his mother called Long Đọi pagoda in 1121. He died in 1127. One of his nephews, Lý Dương Hoán, succeeded him and became known as Emperor Lý Thần Tông (r. 1128–1138). This marked the downfall of Lý family's authority within the court.

Lý Thần Tông was crowned under the supervision of Lê Bá Ngọc, a powerful eunuch. Lê Bá Ngọc adopted a son of the emperor's mother named Đỗ Anh Vũ. During the reign of Lý Thần Tông, Suryavarman II of the Khmer Empire launched an attack on Đại Việt's southern territories in 1128. In 1132 he allied with Cham king Jaya Indravarman III and briefly seized Nghệ An and pillaged Thanh Hoá. In 1135 Duke Đỗ Anh Vũ raised an army and repelled the Khmer invaders. After the Chams refused to support in 1137, Suryavarman II abandoned his incursions on Đại Việt and launched the invasion of Champa. At the same time, Lý Thần Tông began suffering a fatal illness, according to an inscription, and he died in the next year, leaving the infant Lý Thiên Tộ who became Emperor Lý Anh Tông (r. 1138–1175) under Đỗ Anh Vũ's patronage. After Đõ Anh Vũ died in 1159, another powerful figure named Tô Hiến Thành stepped into the role of guarding the dynasty until 1179. In 1149, Javanese and Siamese ships arrived Vân Đồn to trade. The sixth son of Lý Anh Tông, Prince Lý Long Trát was crowned in 1175 as Lý Cao Tông (r. 1175–1210).

By the 1190s, more outsider clans were able to penetrate and infiltrate the royal family, weakening further the Lý authority. Three powerful aristocratic families–Đoàn, Nguyễn, and Trần (descendants of Trần Emperors, a Chinese emigre from Fujian) emerged in the court and contested on behalf of the royals. In 1210, Lý Cao Tông's eldest son Lý Sảm became Emperor Lý Huệ Tông (r. 1210–1224) of Đại Việt. In 1224, Lý Sảm appointed his second princess Lý Phật Kim (Empress Lý Chiêu Hoàng) as successor while he abdicated and became a monk. Finally, in 1225 the Trần leader Trần Thủ Độ sponsored a marriage between his eight-year-old nephew Trần Cảnh with Lý Chiêu Hoàng, that means the Ly would give up power to the Trần, and Trần Cảnh became Emperor Trần Thái Tông of the new dynasty of Đại Việt.

The young Trần Thái Tông centralized the monarchy, organized the civil examination on the Chinese model, built Royal Academy and Confucian Temple, constructed and repaired the delta dikes during his reign. In 1257, the Mongol Empire under Möngke Khan who was waging a war to conquer the Song Empire, sent envoys to Trần Thái Tông, demanded the Emperor of Đại Việt to present himself to the Mongol Khan in Peking. The envoys were imprisoned and the demand was rejected, about 25,000 Mongol–Dali troops led by general Uriyangqadaï to invade Đại Việt from Yunnan, and then to attack the Song from Đại Việt. Unprepared, Trần Thái Tông's army was overwhelmed at battle of Bình Lệ Nguyên on 17 January 1258. Five days later they captured and sacked Thăng Long. The Mongols retreated to Yunnan fourteen days later, as Trần Thái Tông had submitted and sent tribute to Möngke.

Trần Thái Tông's successors Trần Thánh Tông (r. 1258–1278) and Trần Nhân Tông (r. 1278–1293) continued to send tribute to the new Mongol-led Yuan dynasty. In 1283, Yuan emperor Kublai Khan launched the invasion of Champa. In early 1285 he commissioned prince Toghon to led the second invasion of Đại Việt to punish the Vietnamese Emperor Trần Nhân Tông for not helping the Yuan campaign in Champa and refusing to send tribute. Kublai also appointed Trần Ích Tắc, a Trần prince dissent as the puppet Emperor of Đại Việt. Yuan forces though initially captured Thăng Long, however, were defeated by Cham–Vietnamese alliance in June. In 1288 they decided to launch the third and also the largest invasion of Đại Việt but were repelled. Prince Trần Hưng Đạo ended the Mongol yokes through a decisive naval victory in the battle of Bạch Đằng River in April 1288. Đại Việt continued to flourish under the reigns of Trẩn Nhân Tông and Trần Anh Tông (r. 1293–1314).

Crisis of the Fourteenth century

By the 14th century, Đại Việt kingdom began experiencing a long decline. The transitional decade (1326–36) from the end of the Medieval Warm Period to the Mini-ice age period affected the climate of the Red River Delta into extremes. Weather phenomena such as drought, violent flooding, storms frequently occurred, weakened the irrigation system that damaged agriculture production, generating famines, together with widespread non-bubonic plagues, impoverished the peasantry, unleashing robbery and chaos. The estimated population could have been grown from 1.2 million in 1200 to perhaps 2.4 million in 1340.

Trần Anh Tông seized northern Champa in 1307, intervening in Champa's politics through the marriage of Cham king Jaya Simhavarman III with Trần Anh Tông's sister Queen Paramecvariin. Trần Minh Tông (r. 1314–1329) went into conflict with Tai peoples in Laos and Sukhothai from the 1320s to 1330s. During the reign of the weak king Trần Dụ Tông (r. 1341–1369), internal rebellions led by serfs and peasants from the 1340s and 1360s weakened the royal power. In 1369, due to Trần Dụ Tông's lack of an heir to success, Dương Nhật Lễ, a man from the Dương clan, seized power. A short bloody civil war led by the royal Tran family against the Dương clan broke out in 1369–1370 that created turmoil. The Trần reclaimed the crown, enthroning Trần Nghệ Tông (r. 1370–1372) while Dương Nhật Lễ was deposed and executed. Duong's queen mother went into exile in Champa and begged Cham king Po Binasuor to help her get revenge.

Took advantage, Champa Empire under Po Binasuor (Chế Bồng Nga) invaded Đại Việt and ransacked Thăng Long in 1371. Six years later, the Đại Việt army suffered a great defeat at Battle of Vijaya, and Trần Duệ Tông (r. 1373–1377) was killed. The Chams then continued to advance north, besieging, pillaging, and looting Hanoi four times, from 1378 to 1383. War with Champa ended in 1390 after the Cham king Che Bong Nga was killed during his northward offensive by Vietnamese forces led by prince Trần Khát Chân, who used firearms in battle.

Ming conquest and occupation

Hồ Quý Ly (1336–1407)-the minister of the Trần court who has desperately fought off the Cham invasions, now became the most powerful figure in the kingdom. He conducted a series of reforms, including replacing copper coins with banknotes, despite the kingdom still recovering after the devastating war. Time by time, he slowly eliminated the Trần dynasty and aristocracy. In 1400 he deposed the last Trần Emperor and became ruler of Đại Việt. Hồ Quý Ly became emperor, moved the capital to Tây Đô and briefly changed the kingdom's name to Đại Ngu (Great Joy/Peace) (大虞). In 1401 he stepped down and established his second son Hồ Hán Thương (r. 1401–1407) who had Trần blood as king. In 1406, Emperor Yongle of the Ming dynasty, in the name of restoring the Trần dynasty, invaded Đại Ngu. The ill-prepared Vietnamese resistance of Hồ Quý Ly, who failed to get support from his people, especially from the Thăng Long literati, was crumbled and defeated by a Chinese army of 215,000, armed with the newest technology at the time. Đại Ngu kingdom became the thirteenth province of the Ming empire.

The short-lived Ming colonial rule had traumatic impacts on the kingdom and the Vietnamese. In pursuit of their mission civilisatrice (sinicization), the Ming built and opened Confucian schools and shines, prohibited old Vietnamese traditions such as tattooing, sent several thousand Vietnamese scholars to China where they were re-educated in Neo-Confucian classics. Some of these literati would dramatically change the Vietnamese state under the new Lê dynasty when they returned in the 1430s and served the new court, triggering a seismic shift from Mahayana Buddhism to Confucianism. Remains of pre-1400s Hanoi, Buddhist sanctuary and temples, were systematically demolished and reduced to ruins or nothing.

Revival

Lê Lợi-son of a peasant from Thanh Hoá region, led an uprising against the Chinese occupation in spring 1418. He led a war of independence against Ming colonial rule that lasted for 9 years. Assisted by Nguyễn Trãi–a prominent anti-Ming scholar–and other Thanh Hoá families–the Trịnh and the Nguyễn, his rebel forces managed to capture and defeat several major Ming strongholds and counterattacks, eventually drove the Chinese back to the north in 1427. In April 1428, Lê Lợi was proclaimed as Emperor of a new Đại Việt. He established Hanoi as Đông Kinh or the eastern capital, while the dynasty's estate Lam Son became Tây Kinh or the western capital.

Through his proclamation, Lê Lợi called upon educated men of ability to come forward to serve the new monarchy. The old Buddhist aristocrats were stripped during the Ming occupation and gave rise to the new emerging literati class. For the first time, a centralized authority based on proper laws was instituted. Literary examination now became crucial for the Việt state, scholars like Nguyễn Trãi played a large role in the court.

Lê Lợi shifted his main affair focus to the Tai people and the Laotian Lan Xang kingdom in the west, due to their betrayal and becoming allies with the Ming during his rebellion in the 1420s. In 1431 and 1433, the Việt launched several campaigns on various Tai polities, subdued them, and incorporated the northwest region into Đại Việt.

Resurgent kingdom

Succession crisis

Lê Lợi died in 1433. He chose the younger prince Lê Nguyên Long (Lê Thái Tông, r. 1433–1442) as heir instead of the eldest Lê Tư Tề. Later Lê Tư Tề was expelled from the royal family and degraded status to a commoner. Lê Thái Tông was only ten years old when he was crowned in 1433. Lê Lợi's former comrades now fought politically with each other to control the court. Lê Sát used his power as the young emperor's regent to purge opposition factions. When Lê Thái Tông found out about Le Sat's abuses of power, he allied with Lê Sát's rival, Trịnh Khả. In 1437, Lê Sát was arrested and given a death sentence.

In 1439 Lê Thái Tông launched a campaign against rebelling Tai vassals in the west and Chinese settlers in Đại Việt. He ordered the Chinese to cut their hair short and wear clothes of the Kinh people. One of his sisters raised in China was forced to commit suicide, being accused of endless conspiracies. Later he had four princes: The eldest son Lê Nghi Dân, the second Lê Khắc Xương, the third Lê Bang Cơ, and the youngest Lê Hạo. In 1442 the emperor died in suspicion after a visit to Nguyễn Trãi's family. Nguyễn Trãi and his clan, relatives were innocently condemned to death.

One-year-old Lê Bang Cơ (Lê Nhân Tông, r. 1442–1459) assumed the throne a few days after his father's death. The emperor was too young and most political power of the court fell Lê Lợi's former comrades Trịnh Khả and Lê Thụ, who allied with the queen mother Nguyễn Thị Anh. During the dry season of 1445–1446, Trịnh Khả, Lê Thụ, and Trịnh Khắc Phục attacked Champa and took Vijaya, where the king of Champa Maha Vijaya (r. 1441–1446) was captured. Trịnh Khả installed Maha Kali (r. 1446–1449) as a puppet king, however, three years later Kali's elder brother murdered him and became king. Relations between the two kingdoms downfall into hostility. In 1451, amidst chaotic political struggles, Queen Nguyễn Thị Anh ordered Trịnh Khả to be executed for an accusation of conspiracy against the royal throne. Only two of Lê Lợi's former comrades, Nguyễn Xí and Đinh Liệt were still alive.

During a night in late 1459, Prince Lê Nghi Dân and followers stormed into the palace, stabbed his half-brother and the mother. Four days later he was proclaimed as emperor. Nghi Dân ruled the kingdom for 8 months, then the two former-Nguyễn Xí and Đinh Liệt carried a coup against him. Two days after Nghi Dân's death, the youngest prince Lê Hạo was crowned, known as Emperor Lê Thánh Tông the Overflowing Virtue (r. 1460–1479).

Lê Thánh Tông's reforms

In the 1460s, Lê Thánh Tông carried out a series of reforms, from centralizing government, built the first extensive bureaucracy and strong fiscal system, institutionalizing education, trade, and laws. He greatly reduced the power of the traditional Buddhist aristocracy with a scholar-literati class, ushered a brief golden age. Classical scholarly, literature (in nom script), science, music, and culture flourished. Hanoi emerged as the centre of learning of Southeast Asia in the 15th century. Lê Thánh Tông's reforms helped heightened the power of the king and the bureaucratic system, allowing him to mobilize a more massive army and resources that overawed the local nobility and capable to expand the Việt territories.

To expand the kingdom, Lê Thánh Tông launched an invasion of Champa in early 1471 that brought destruction to the Cham civilization and made the rump state Panduranga a vassal of Đại Việt. Respond to disputes with Laos over Muang Phuan and the mistreatment of the Laotian envoy, Lê Thánh Tông led a strong army that invaded Laos in 1479, sacked Luang Phabang, occupied it for five years, and advanced far away as Upper Burma. Vietnamese products, particularly porcelains, were sold throughout Southeast Asia, China, and also in modern-day East African coast, Japan, Iran and Turkey.

Decline and disintegration

In the next few decades after Lê Thánh Tông's death in 1497, Đại Việt once again fell to civil unrest. Agricultural failures, rapid population growth, corruption, and factionalism all compounded to stress the kingdom, leading to a rapid decline. Eight weak Lê kings briefly held power. During the reign Lê Uy Mục–known as the "devil king" (r. 1505–1509), bloody fighting ignited between the two rival Thanh Hoá families in the cadet branch, the Trịnh and the Nguyễn on behalf of the ruling dynasty. Lê Tương Dực (r. 1509–1514) tried to restore stability, but chaotic political struggles and rebellions returned years later. In 1516 a Buddhist-peasant rebellion led by Trần Cảo stormed the capital, killed the emperor, plundered, and destroyed the royal palace along with its library. The Trịnh and Nguyễn clans briefly ceased hostility for a short time, suppressed Trần Cảo, and installed a young prince as Lê Chiêu Tông (r. 1517–1522), then they quickly turned against each other and forced the king to flee.

The chaos prompted Mạc Đăng Dung, a military officer and well-educated in Confucian classics, to rise up and try to restore order. By 1522, he effectively subjugated the two warring clans and put down the rebellions while establishing his clan and supporters to the government. In 1527 he enforced the young Lê king to abdicate and proclaimed himself emperor and began the rule of the Mạc dynasty. Six years later, Nguyễn Kim–a Nguyễn noble and Lê loyalist-rebelled against the Mạc, enthroned Lê Duy Ninh–a descendant of Lê Lợi and began the monarchy-in-exile in Laos. In 1542 they reemerged from the south, known as the southern court, laid claim to the Vietnamese crown, and opposed the Mạc (the northern court). The Việt kingdom now fell into a long period of depressions, decentralization, chaos, and civil wars that lasted for three centuries.

The Lê (assisted by Nguyễn Kim) and the Mạc loyalists fought on behalf of reclaiming the legitimate Vietnamese crown. When Nguyễn Kim died in 1545, the power of the Lê dynasty swiftly fell into the dictate of the lord Trịnh Kiểm of the Trịnh family. One of Nguyễn Kim's sons, Nguyễn Hoàng, was appointed as ruler of the southern part of the kingdom, thus began the Nguyễn family rule over Đàng Trong.

The Lê-Trịnh loyalists expelled the Mạc from Hanoi in 1592, forcing them to flee into the mountainous hinterland, where their reign lasted until 1677.

The Trịnh-controlled northern Đại Việt was known as Đàng Ngoài (Outer Realm), while the Nguyễn-controlled south became Đàng Trong (Inner Realm). They fought a fifty-year civil war (1627–1673), which ended inconclusively and the two lords signed a peace treaty. This stable division would last until 1771 when three Tây Sơn brothers Nguyễn Nhạc, Nguyễn Huệ and Nguyễn Lữ led a peasant revolution that would overrun and topple the Nguyễn, the Trịnh lords, and the Le dynasty. In 1789, the Tây Sơn defeated a Qing intervention that sought to restore the Lê dynasty. Nguyễn Nhạc established a monarchy in 1778 (Thái Đức), followed by his brother Nguyễn Huệ (Emperor Quang Trung, r. 1789–1792) and nephew Nguyễn Quang Toản (Emperor Cảnh Thịnh, r. 1792–1802), while a descendant of the Nguyễn lords, Nguyễn Ánh returned to the Mekong Delta, after several years exiled in Thailand and France. Ten years later Nguyễn loyalists defeated the Tây Sơn and conquered the whole kingdom. Nguyễn Anh became the emperor of the new unified Vietnamese state.

Political structure

Pre-1200s
In the early Đại Việt period (pre-1200), the Viet monarchy existed as a form of what historians describe as a "charter state" or a "mandala state." In 1973, Minoru Katakura used the term "centralized feudal system" to describe the Lý dynasty's Viet state. Yumio Sakurai reconstructed the Lý dynasty as a local dynasty, that the dynasty was only able to control several inner areas, while outer areas (phu) were autonomously governed by local clans of various ethnolinguistic backgrounds, who aligned to the royal clan through Buddhist alliances, such as temples. The Viet king "man of prowess" was the center of the mandala structure that has influences beyond the Red River Delta via Buddhist alliance with local lords, while a bureaucracy was still practically nonexistent. For examples, an inscription dating from 1107 in Hà Giang records the religious-political connection between the Nùng Hà clan with the dynasty, or another inscription dated 1100 commemorates Lý Thường Kiệt as the lord of Thanh Hoá. As a mandala realm, according to F. K. Lehman, its direct territories could not exceed more than 150 miles in diameter, however, the Đại Việt kingdom was able to maintain a large influence sphere due to active coastal trade and maritime activities with other Southeast Asian states.

Trần-Hồ period
During the 13th and 14th century as the Trần dynasty ruled the kingdom, the Trần first move was preventing matrilineality clans to take over the royal family, by adopting the king–retired king relation, which the emperor usually abdicated in favor of his eldest son while retaining power behind the scenes, and practicing consanguine marriage. To prevent maternal families’ influences, Trần kings took only queens from their dynastic lineage. The state had been more centralized, taxes and bureaucracy appeared, chronicles were written down. Most power is concentrated in the hands of the emperor and the royal families. In the lowland, the Trần removed all non-Trần, autonomous aristocratic clans from the power, appointed Trần princes to rule these lands, tightened up relations between the state and locals. Working in Trần princely lands were serfs-poor peasants that own no land and slaves. Large hydraulic projects that mobilized more labors such as Red River Delta’s dyke system were constructed-one that maintained and increased its particularly wet-rice-based agricultural economy and its population by diverting rivers to aid in irrigation. Confucianism was ensured by the Trần monarchs as the second belief, gave rise to the literati class, which later became rivals to the established Buddhist clergies.

The Việt monarchy during this period faced a series of massive Yuan and Cham invasions, political unrest, famines, disasters, and diseases, and was led to a nearly collapse in the late 1300s. Hồ Quý Ly as the minister had tried to fix the troubles by eliminating the Trần aristocrats, limiting monks, and promote Chinese classic learning, however, resulted in political catastrophe.

Early modern period

From Lê Thánh Tông's 1463 reforms onward, the Vietnamese state's structure was modeled after the Ming dynasty of China. He established six Ministries and six Courts. The government had been centralized. By 1471, Đại Việt was divided into 12 provinces and one capital city (Thăng Long), each governed by a provincial government consisted of military commanders, civil administrators, and judicial officers. Lê Thánh Tông employed 5,300 officials into the bureaucracy. A new legal code called the Lê Code was published in 1462 and was practiced until 1803.

As a Confucian king, Le Thanh Tong generally disliked cosmopolitanism and foreign trade. He banned slavery, which had been popular during previous centuries, limited trade and commercial. During his reign, power was based on institutional obligations that enforced loyalty to court and merits, rather a religious relationship between aristocracy and the royal court. Self-sufficient agriculture and state-monopolized crafting were encouraged.

The social hierarchy of 15th century Đại Việt comprised:
 Vua/Hoàng Đế–Emperor
 Hoàng Tử–Crown Prince
 Vương–Ordinary princes
 Công–Duke
 Hầu–Marquis
 Bá–Count
Non-royal nobility:
 Tử–Viscount
 Nam–Baron

After the death of Le Thanh Tong in 1497, the social-political orders he had built gradually fell apart as Đại Việt was entering its chaotic disintegration period under the reigns of his weak successors. Social upheavals, ecological crisis, corruption, irreparable failing system, political rivalry, rebellions pushed the kingdom to a climatic burst of civil war between rival clans. The last Le king was overthrown by general Mạc Đăng Dung in 1527, who promised to restore "Le Thanh Tong's golden era and stability." For the next six decades, from 1533 to 1592, the raging civil war between the Le loyalists and the Mạc had ruined much of the polity. The Trịnh and Nguyễn clans both assisted the Le loyalists in their struggle against the Mạc.

After the Le-Mac war ended in 1592 with the Mạc ousted from the Red River Delta, the two clans of Trịnh and Nguyễn who revived the Le dynasty emerged as the strongest powers, and resumed their own infighting, from 1627 to 1672. The northern Trịnh clan had installed themselves as regency for the Le dynasty by 1545, but in reality, they hold most power of the royal court and de facto rulers of the northern half of Đại Việt, and began using the title Chúa (lord), which is outside of the classical hierarchy of nobility. The Le king was reduced to a figurehead, he ruled in earnest, while the Trịnh lord had total power to select and enthrone or remove any king the lord favors. The southern Nguyễn leader also began to proclaim as Chúa lord in 1558. Initially, they were considered subjects of the Le court, which was controlled by the Trịnh lord. But later, by the early 1600s, they ruled southern Đại Việt like an independent kingdom and became the main rival to the Trịnh domain. Le Thanh Tong's legacy such as his 1463 Code and bureaucratic institutions, was revived in the north and somehow continued to persist and lasted until French Indochina period.

Before and after the war, the two Thanh Hoá clans divided the kingdom into two simultaneously coexist but rival regimes: the northern Đàng Ngoài or Tonkin ruled by the Trịnh family while the southern Đàng Trong or Cochinchina ruled by the Nguyễn family; their natural border is the city of Đồng Hới (18th parallel north). Each polity had its own independent court, however, the Nguyễn lord still sought to subordinate himself with the Lê dynasty, which also stayed under Trịnh supervision, trying to pretend an imaginary unity. Paying homage and respect to the Le king remained a source of both lords' legitimacy and of adherence to the idea of a unified Vietnamese state, even if such a thing no longer existed or was loosely emptied.

The Tay Son rebellion of the late 18th century Đại Việt was an extraordinary movement of Đại Việt's chaotic period when the three Tay Son brothers divided the kingdom into three subordinating but independently realms ruled by them who all declared kings: Nguyen Hue controlled the north, Nguyen Nhac controlled the central, and Nguyen Lu controlled the Mekong Delta.

Economy

Fan Chengda (1126–1193), a Chinese statesman and geographer, wrote an account in 1176 that described the medieval Vietnamese economy:

Unlike southern neighbor Champa, medieval (900-1500 AD) Đại Việt was mostly an agricultural kingdom, centered around the Red River Delta. Most stelae epigraphs discussing the economy from this period concerned land reclamation, maintaining irrigation system of the Red River, culminating fields, harvesting, and the king's land donation to Buddhist clergies. Trade was not primarily important in Đại Việt, although Đại Việt's ceramic exports blossomed for several decades during the 15th century. Le Thanh Tong-the greatest king of the 15th century who had conquered Champa, once said "Do not cast aside the roots (agriculture) and pursue the insignificant trade/(commerce)", showcasing his unfavorable views toward trade and merchandising.

Đại Việt's only single port located at the mouth of the Red River–a town called Van Don–near Ha Long Bay, was considered too far away from the main sea route. Similarly, Marco Polo also made his description of Đại Việt where he did not visit but gathered information from the Mongols: "They find in this country a good deal of gold, and they also have a great abundance of spices. But they are such a long way from the sea that the products are of little value, and thus their price is low." Most Southeast Asian and Indian merchant ships sailing along the Vietnamese coast of the South China Sea often stopped at Champa's port-cities, then bypassed Đại Việt and the Gulf of Tonkin, and headed on to southeast China.

Compared to a more well-known Champa, Đại Việt was little known to the faraway world until the 16th century with the arrival of Spanish and Portuguese explorers. Medieval sources such as Ibn al-Nadim's The Book Catalogue (c. 988 AD) mention that the king of Luqin or Lukin (Đại Việt) invaded the state of Sanf (Champa) in 982. Đại Việt was included in the Arab geographer Muhammad al-Idrisi's world atlas–the Tabula Rogeriana. In the early 1300s, Đại Việt was briefly chronicled by Persian historian Rashid al-Din in his Ilkhanid annals as Kafje-Guh, which was the rendition of a Mongol/Chinese toponym for Đại Việt, Jiaozhiquo.

Art and religion

Buddhism had penetrated to modern-day Vietnam around the first century AD, during the Han occupation. By the 8th century, Mahayana Buddhism had become the dominant faith of the Red River Delta Region. The development of Mahayana faiths there undoubtly gave the rise for several Buddhist dynasties that would rule Đại Việt. The epigraphy of Thanh Mai inscription (c. 798) indicates that a Chinese-influenced Buddhist sect was widely practiced among the Red River dwellers during the Tang period. Buddhist scriptures claim that in 580, an Indian monk named Vinītaruci arrived northern Vietnam and founded the Thiền patriarch (Vietnamese Zen Buddhism). In 820, a Chinese monk named Wu Yantong arrived northern Vietnam and found the second Thiền sect, which lasted to the 13th century. In 1293, Trần Nhân Tông personally opened a new Thiền patriarch called Trúc Lâm, which is still operating today.

Vietnamese Buddhism gained an apex during the medieval period. The king, the court, and society were deeply Buddhist. According to Đinh Liễn's Ratnaketu Dhāraṇī inscriptions (c. 973), Mahayana Buddhism and some elements of Tantric Buddhism were promoted by the emperor and the royals, who devoutly Buddhists. Mahayana sutras were inscribed along with the Prince's speech on these pillars. The inscription of Lê Đại Hành (c. 995) however mentioned Thiền Buddhism as the royal religion. By the early 11th century, Mahayana, Hinduism, folk beliefs, and spiritual worship was fused and formed into a new religion by Ly royals, who frequently performed Buddhist rituals, blood oaths, and prayed for spiritual deities. This syncretic religion, dubbed as "Ly dynasty religion" by Taylor, embraces the amalgamating worship of Buddhism, Indian Buddhist deities Indra and Brahma, and Cham folk legend Lady Po Nagar. The Lý dynasty religion later was absorbed into Vietnamese folk religion. The emperors built temples and statues delicate for Indra and Brahma in 1016, 1057, and 1134, along with temples for Vietnamese legends. At the funeral, the emperor's body was put on a pyre to be burned, according to Buddhist tradition. The main characteristics of Vietnamese Buddhists were largely influenced by Chinese Chan Buddhists. A temple inscription dated from 1226 in Hanoi describes a Vietnamese Buddhist altar: "the Buddha statue was flanked by an Apsara, one of the Hindu water and cloud nymphs, and a Bodhisattva with a clenched fist. Before the altar stood statues of a Guardian of the Dharma flanked by Mỹ Âm, king of the Gandharvas, mythical musician husbands of the Apsaras, and Kauṇḍinya, the Buddha's leading early disciple."

The Buddhist sangha sponsored by the royals, owned the majority of farmlands and the kingdom's wealth. A stele erected in 1209 records that the royal family had donated 126 acres of land to a pagoda. A Vietnamese Buddhist temple often consists of a temple built by timber, and pagoda/stupas made of bricks or granite rocks. Việt Buddhist art notably shares similarities with Cham art, especially at sculptures. The dragon bodhi leaf sculpture symbolizes the emperor, while the phoenix bodhi leaf stands for the queen. Buddhism shaped the society and the laws during the Ly dynasty Đại Việt. Princes and royals were raised in Buddhist monasteries and monkhood. A Buddhist Arhat Assembly was instituted to legislate monastic and temple affairs generated relatively tolerant laws.

Vietnamese Buddhism declined in the 15th century due to the Ming Chinese Neo-Confucianism anti-Buddhist agenda and later Le monarchs downplaying of Buddhism, but was revived in the 16th–18th century when the royal family's efforts to restore Buddhism's role in society, which resulted in today Vietnam's majority Buddhist country. In the south, thanked the effort of Chinese monk Shilian Dashan in 1694–1695, the whole Nguyễn family converted themselves from secularism to Buddhism. The Nguyễn also incorporated local Cham deities into Southern Vietnamese Buddhism. The Đình–village temples–persisted from the 15th century are the centre of village administration and prohibited Buddhist-based cults and local deities.

Maps

Timeline (dynasties)
Started in 968 and ended in 1804.

Notes

See also
 Champa
 List of monarchs of Việt Nam

References

Citations

Sources

Further reading

 
 Wade, Geoff. tr. (2005). Southeast Asia in the Ming Shi-lu: an open access resource. Singapore: Asia Research Institute and the Singapore E-Press, National University of Singapore.
 
  (Rome, 1650)
  (Lyon, 1652)
  (Lyon, 1651), translated by Henri Albi
  (Paris, 1653), translated into English as Rhodes of Viet Nam: The Travels and Missions of Father Alexandre de Rhodes in China and Other Kingdoms of the Orient (1666)
  (The Glorious Death of Andrew, Catechist) (pub. 1653)
 Royal Geographical Society, The Journal of the Royal Geographical Society: Volume 7 (1837)

External links
 

968 establishments
10th-century establishments in Asia
1054 establishments in Asia
11th-century establishments in Vietnam
1400 disestablishments in Asia
15th-century disestablishments in Vietnam
1428 establishments in Asia
15th-century establishments in Vietnam
1802 disestablishments in Vietnam
History of Vietnam
Former countries in Vietnamese history
Former countries in Southeast Asia
 
Former empires in Asia